Hendrina Elizabeth "Drienkie" van Wyk (born 13 January 1971) is a South African woman athlete. Her discipline is shot put. Van Wyk is the current South African women shot put record holder.

Upbringing
Van Wyk was born to Mike and Engela van Wyk. She grew up in Alberton, Gauteng, South Africa.

Athletics
On 25 February 2002, she broke the South African Women Shot put record, with a distance of 17.88m.  (16 years) this records still stands. It was done in Germiston, South Africa. She was the National Champion in 2002 when she won the Shot Put at the National Championships held in Durban on 23 March 2002.

In 2002, she was World-ranked at No. 32.

Body building
She participated in NABBA (National Amateur Body Building Association) Universe competition representing South Africa and came seventh in the class Miss physique-tall.

Personal life
She married Morne Visagie in 2006. She is a sports trainer and owner of a nutrition shop.

References

South African female shot putters
1971 births
Living people
People from Alberton, Gauteng
Sportspeople from Gauteng